Karina Birkelund (born 27 July 1980) is a Norwegian retired alpine skier.

She made her FIS Alpine Ski World Cup debut in March 2003 in Åre, without finishing the race. She collected her first World Cup points with a 27th-place finish in Madonna di Campiglio in December 2003, and then recorded two 16th places. In December 2004, she had her best World Cup placement with a ninth place in the giant slalom in St. Moritz. Her last World Cup appearance was in December 2006.

She is from Søvik, Os, and represented the sports club Fana IL.

References 

1980 births
Living people
People from Os, Hordaland
Norwegian female alpine skiers
Sportspeople from Vestland